Bill Theunissen Stadium is a baseball venue in Mount Pleasant, Michigan, United States.  It is home to the Central Michigan Chippewas baseball team of the NCAA Division I Mid-American Conference.  The venue has a capacity of 2,046 spectators and opened in 2002.  It is named after Bill Theunissen, former Central Michigan baseball coach, who led the Chippewas to a 151-114-1 record during his tenure (1953–1962).

History 
Following the 2001 season, Theunissen Stadium replaced Central Michigan's old Theunissen Stadium, home to the program since 1948.  The old facility's name, changed from Alumni Field in 1986, was kept for the new Bill Theunissen Stadium.  The venue's first game came on March 29, 2002, against Ohio.  It was formally dedicated during an April 27, 2002, doubleheader against Northern Illinois.

Features and renovations 
Features of the facility include 400 chairbacked seats, a press box, message board, electronic scoreboard, outdoor practice area, and the Keilitz Clubhouse.  In 2010, fencing was added to the practice facility adjacent to the stadium.

See also 
 List of NCAA Division I baseball venues

References

External links
Bill Theunissen Stadium photo gallery

College baseball venues in the United States
Baseball venues in Michigan
Sports venues completed in 2002
Central Michigan Chippewas baseball
Buildings and structures in Isabella County, Michigan
2002 establishments in Michigan